The 1993 Big League World Series took place from August 13–21 in Fort Lauderdale, Florida, United States. Taipei, Taiwan defeated host Broward County, Florida in the championship game. 

A new format was introduced this year. The 11 team double-elimination format was replaced with two (International, and United States) double-elimination brackets, culminating with a winner-take-all championship game.

Teams

Results

United States Bracket

International Bracket

Elimination Round

References

Big League World Series
Big League World Series